The 4th Politburo of the Communist Party of Cuba (PCC) was elected in 1991 by the 1st Plenary Session of the 4th Central Committee, in the immediate aftermath of the 4th Party Congress.

Members

References

Specific

Bibliography
Articles and journals:
 

4th Politburo of the Communist Party of Cuba
1991 establishments in Cuba
1997 disestablishments in Cuba